Queens Supreme is an American courtroom dramedy television series created by Dan and Peter Thomas, which aired on CBS from January 10 to January 24, 2003. The series had a strong cast and considerable financial backing, especially from Julia Roberts's Shoelace Productions, Spelling Television and Revolution Studios, however poor ratings forced its cancellation after three episodes.

Premise 
The series starred Oliver Platt as New York judge Jack Moran who, with his equally eccentric and colorful colleagues, preside over court cases as the real-life Queens Supreme Court in Long Island City, Queens.

Characters 
Jack Moran (Oliver Platt) – a brilliant, cynical judge whose integrity and wisdom are often overshadowed by his non-conformist and occasionally bizarre courtroom behavior.
Judge Thomas O'Neill (Robert Loggia) – the highest-ranking judge at the courthouse, O'Neill serves as the voice of reason and it often falls upon him to keep the peace among his colleagues.
Kim Vicidomini (Annabella Sciorra) – newly appointed to the courthouse, she is a young and ambitious judge who is both highly skilled and has political connections.
Rose Barnea (L. Scott Caldwell) – another senior judge, Barnea is hardworking and often brutally frank. She is particularly critical of Kim Vicidomini soon after her arrival.
Carmen Hui (Marcy Harriell) and Mike Powell (James Madio) – two helpful law clerks who assist the judges.

Production 
The idea for the series came about when two New York attorneys, twin brothers Dan and Peter Thomas, were discussing courtroom stories based on their shared experiences in Queens while on a plane flight to California in 2001. One of the passengers, a Hollywood producer, was sitting next to them and mentioned that they could be the basis for a television series. Indeed, the producer brought the idea to screenwriter Kevin Fox who later successfully pitched it to CBS. Fox was initially hesitant in becoming involved, feeling there were too many courtroom dramas already, but agreed after spending time at the New York Supreme Court himself.

The project was helped along by Dan's wife Elaine Goldsmith-Thomas, head of Red Om Films (a subsidiary of Julia Roberts' production company Shoelace Productions) and a partner in Joe Roth's Revolution Studios, who was then looking for film and television products to develop. Her involvement was partially responsible in bringing such a high-profile cast and crew to the series.

The television pilot was filmed at both the Long Island City and New York State Supreme Courthouses by actor Tim Robbins in mid-August 2002 and 12 episodes were eventually ordered by the network. A midseason replacement for Robbery Homicide Division, Queens Supreme premiered on January 10, 2003, alongside Presidio Med in the prime-time Friday night timeslot.

Episodes

References

Sources

External links 

2000s American comedy-drama television series
2003 American television series debuts
2003 American television series endings
English-language television shows
CBS original programming
2000s American legal television series
Television series by CBS Studios
Television series by Spelling Television
Television shows set in Queens
Television shows filmed in New York City